Megatherium (from Greek  'great' +  'beast') is an extinct genus of ground sloths endemic to South America that lived from the Early Pliocene through the end of the Pleistocene. It is best known for the elephant-sized type species M. americanum, sometimes called the giant ground sloth, or the megathere, native to the Pampas through southern Bolivia during the Pleistocene. Various other smaller species belonging to the subgenus Pseudomegatherium are known from the Andes. 

Megatherium is part of the sloth family Megatheriidae, which also includes the similarly giant Eremotherium, comparable in size to M. americanum, which was native to tropical South America, Central America and North America as far north as the southern United States. Only a few other land mammals equaled or exceeded M. americanum in size, such as large proboscideans (e.g., elephants) and the giant rhinoceros Paraceratherium. Megatherium was first discovered in 1788 on the bank of the Luján River in Argentina. The holotype specimen was then shipped to Spain the following year wherein it caught the attention of the paleontologist Georges Cuvier, who was the first to determine, by means of comparative anatomy, that Megatherium was a sloth. Megatherium became extinct around 12,000 years ago during the Quaternary extinction event, which also claimed most other large mammals in the New World. The extinction coincides with the settlement of the Americas, and a kill site where a M. americanum was slaughtered and butchered is known, suggesting that hunting could have caused its extinction.

Description 

It was one of the largest ground sloths, about as big as modern Asian elephants. Megatherium species were members of the abundant Pleistocene megafauna, large mammals that lived during the Pleistocene epoch.

Megatherium had a robust skeleton with a large pelvic girdle and a broad muscular tail. Its large size enabled it to feed at heights unreachable by other contemporary herbivores. Rising on its powerful hind legs and using its tail to form a tripod, Megatherium could support its massive body weight while using the curved claws on its long forelegs to pull down branches with the choicest leaves. This sloth, like a modern anteater, walked on the sides of its feet because its claws prevented it from putting them flat on the ground. Although it was primarily a quadruped, its trackways show that it was capable of bipedal locomotion. Biomechanical analysis also suggests it had adaptations to bipedalism.

One study has proposed that Megatherium was mostly hairless, like modern elephants, because its large size and small surface-area-to-volume ratio would have made it susceptible to overheating.

Mouth 
Megatherium had a narrow, cone-shaped mouth and prehensile lips that were probably used to select particular plants and fruits. Megatherium also possessed the narrowest muzzle of all ground sloths from the Pleistocene, possibly meaning it was a very selective eater, able to carefully pick and choose which leaves and twigs to consume. While some evidence suggests the animal could use its tongue to differentiate and select its foliage, the lips probably had a more important role in this. In Megatherium, the stylohyal and epihyal bones (parts of the hyoid bone which supports the tongue and is located in the throat) were fused together, and the apparatus lies farther upwards the throat, which, together with the elongated, steeply inclined mandibular symphysis, indicates a relatively shorter geniohyoid muscle and thus more limited capacity for tongue protrusion. Analysis of wear and the biomechanics of the chewing muscles suggests that they chewed vertically. Megatheres displayed deeper jaws than other sloths.

Like other sloths, Megatherium lacked the enamel, deciduous dentition and dental cusp patterns of other mammals. Instead of enamel, the tooth displays a layer of cementum, orthodentine and modified orthodentine, creating a soft, easily abraded surface. The teeth of M. americanum exhibit extreme hypsodonty, indicative of its gritty, fibrous diet. Their teeth in side view show interlocking V-shaped biting surfaces, although they are nearly square in cross-section and exhibit bilophodonty. The teeth are spaced equidistantly in a series, located in the back of the mouth, which leaves space at the predentary, but with no diastema, although the length of this tooth row and of the predentary spout can vary by species.

Taxonomy 
Megatherium is divided into 2 subgenera, Megatherium and Pseudomegatherium. Taxonomy according to Pujos (2006):

 Subgenus Megatherium
†M. altiplanicum 
†M. americanum 
 Subgenus Pseudomegatherium 
 †M. celendinense 
 †M. medinae 
 †M. sundti 
 †M. urbinai 

The first fossil specimen of Megatherium was discovered in 1788 by Manuel Torres, on the bank of the Luján River in Argentina. The fossil was shipped to Museo Nacional de Ciencias Naturales in Madrid the following year, where it remains. It was reassembled by museum employee Juan Bautista Bru, who also drew the skeleton and some individual bones.

Based on Bru's illustrations, comparative anatomist Georges Cuvier determined the relationships and appearance of Megatherium. He published his first paper on the subject in 1796, a transcript of a previous lecture at the French Academy of Sciences. He published on the subject again in 1804; this paper was republished in his book Recherches sur les ossemens fossiles de quadrupèdes. In his 1796 paper, Cuvier assigned the fossil the scientific name Megatherium americanum. Cuvier determined that Megatherium was a sloth, and at first believed that it used its large claws for climbing trees, like modern sloths, although he later changed his hypothesis to support a subterranean lifestyle, with the claws used to dig tunnels.

Fossils of Megatherium and other western megafauna proved popular with the Georgian-era public, preceding the discovery of giant dinosaurs some decades later.

Since the original discovery, numerous other fossil Megatherium skeletons have been discovered across South America, in Argentina, Bolivia, Brazil, Chile, Colombia (Quipile, Cundinamarca), Guyana, Paraguay, Peru and Uruguay. New species in the genus Megatherium, M. urbinai and M. celendinense, have been described in 2004 and 2006, respectively. M. celedinense is named after Celendin, Cajamarca Province in the Peruvian Andes. These species are considerably smaller than M. americanum, and are considered to belong to a separate subgenus, Pseudomegatherium.

The species Megatherium (Pseudomegatherium) tarijense, appears to be a junior synonym of M. americanum, and merely a small individual.

The species Megatherium filholi Moreno, 1888 of the Pampas, previously thought to be a junior synonym of M. americanum representing juvenile individuals, was suggested to be a distinct valid species in 2019.

Megatherium gallardoi  from the Ensenadan of Argentina was suggested to be a valid species in 2008, most closely related to M. americanum and M. altiplanicum.

M. parodii , and M. istilarti  have not had their validity assessed in recent literature.

Evolution 

Ground sloths are a diverse group belonging to superorder Xenarthra, which also includes extinct pampatheres and glyptodonts, as well as living tree sloths, anteaters and armadillos. One of the four major eutherian radiations, this superorder evolved in isolation in South America while it was an island continent during the Paleogene and Neogene. The family to which Megatherium belongs, Megatheriidae, is related within superfamily Megatherioidea to the extinct families Nothrotheriidae and Megalonychidae, and to living three-toed sloths of family Bradypodidae, as deduced recently from collagen and mitochondrial DNA sequences obtained from subfossil bones.

During the Pliocene, the Central American Isthmus formed, causing the Great American Interchange, and a mass extinction of much of the indigenous South American megafauna. Xenarthrans were largely unaffected and continued to thrive in spite of competition from the northern immigrants. Ground sloths were prominent among the various South American animal groups to migrate northwards into North America, where they remained and flourished until the late Pleistocene.

The rhinoceros-sized Promegatherium of the Miocene is suggested to be the ancestor of Megatherium. The oldest (and smallest) species of Megatherium is M. altiplanicum of Pliocene Bolivia. It was very similar to Promegatherium, and was also about the size of a rhinoceros. M. tarijense has been regarded as a medium-sized Megatherium species, larger than M. altiplanicum, but smaller than M. americanum. It roamed from the Tarija Basin in Bolivia to Yantac in Peru. The oldest-known remains of Megatherium from the Pampas dates to the late Pliocene, around 3.58 million years ago. Species of Megatherium became larger over time, with the largest species, M. americanum of the Late Pleistocene, reaching the size of an African elephant. The oldest records of M. americanum are from the latter half of the Middle Pleistocene, around 0.4 Ma (400 ka) ago.

Habitat 
Megatherium inhabited woodland and grassland environments of the lightly wooded areas of South America, with a Late Pleistocene range centred around the Pampas where it was an endemic species, as recently as 10,000 years ago. Megatherium was adapted to temperate, arid or semiarid open habitats. An example of these most recent finds is at Cueva del Milodón in Patagonian Chile. The closely related genus Eremotherium (that has been classified occasionally as part of Megatherium) lived in more tropical environments further north, and invaded temperate North America as part of the Great American Interchange.

Paleobiology 

The giant ground sloth lived mostly in groups, but it may have lived singly in caves. It probably had mainly a browsing diet in open habitats, but also it probably fed on other moderate to soft tough food. For millions of years, the sloth did not have many enemies to bother it, so it was probably a diurnal animal.

The giant ground sloth was a herbivore, feeding on leaves such as yuccas, agaves and grasses. While it fed chiefly on terrestrial plants, it could also stand on its hind legs, using its tail as a balancing tripod, and reach for upper growth vegetation. It would pull itself upright to sit on its haunches or to stand and then tugged at plants with its feet, digging them up with the five sharp claws on each foot. The sloth used its simple teeth to grind down food before swallowing it, and its highly developed cheek muscles helped in this process. The sloth's stomach was able to digest coarse and fibrous food. It is likely that it spent a lot of time resting to aid digestion.

A recent morpho-functional analysis indicates that M. americanum was adapted for strong vertical biting. The teeth are hypsodont and bilophodont, and the sagittal section of each loph is triangular with a sharp edge. This suggests that the teeth were used for cutting, rather than grinding, and that hard fibrous food was not the primary dietary component.

While it has been suggested that the giant sloth may have been partly carnivorous, this is a controversial claim. Richard Fariña and Ernesto Blanco of the Universidad de la República in Montevideo have analysed a fossil skeleton of M. americanum and discovered that its olecranon—the part of the elbow to which the triceps muscle attaches—was very short. This adaptation is found in carnivores and optimises speed rather than strength. The researchers say this would have enabled M. americanum to use its claws like daggers. They suggest that to add nutrients to its diet, Megatherium may have taken over the kills of Smilodon. Based on the estimated strength and mechanical advantage of its biceps, it has been proposed that Megatherium could have overturned adult glyptodonts (large, armored xenarthrans, related to armadillos) as a means of scavenging or hunting these animals. However, noting that sloths lack the carnassials typical of predators and that traces of bone are absent from the many preserved deposits of sloth dung, Paul Martin has described this proposal as "fanciful". Carbon isotope analysis has found that Megatherium has isotope values similar to other megafaunal herbivores such as mammoths, glyptodonts and Macrauchenia, and significantly unlike omnivorous and carnivorous mammals, suggesting that Megatherium was an obligate herbivore.

Extinction 
In the south, the giant ground sloth flourished until about 10,500 radiocarbon years BP (8,500 BCE). Most cite the appearance of an expanding population of human hunters as the cause of its extinction. There are a few late dates of around 8,000 BP and one of 7,000 BP for Megatherium remains, but the most recent date viewed as credible is about 10,000 BP. The use of bioclimatic envelope modeling indicates that the area of suitable habitat for Megatherium had shrunk and become fragmented by the mid-Holocene. While this alone would not likely have caused its extinction, it has been cited as a possible contributing factor. Two M. americanum bones, an ulna and an atlas vertebra, from separate collections, bear cut marks suggestive of butchery, with the latter suggested to represent an attempt to exploit the contents of the head. A kill site dating to around 12,600 BP is known from Campo Laborde in the Pampas in Argentina, where a single individual of M. americanum was slaughtered and butchered, which is the only confirmed giant ground-sloth kill site in the Americas. The study also questioned the Holocene dates previously obtained for Pampas megafauna, suggesting that they were due to humic acid contamination. Another possible kill site is Arroyo Seco 2 near Tres Arroyos in the Pampas in Argentina, where M. americanum bones amongst those of other megafauna were found associated with humans artifacts dating to approximately 14,782–11,142 cal yr BP.

Cultural references 

The Megatherium Club, named for the extinct animal and founded by William Stimpson, was a group of Washington, D.C.-based scientists who were attracted to that city by the Smithsonian Institution's rapidly growing collection, from 1857 to 1866.

See also 
 Paleoburrow

Notes

References

External links 

 BBC – Walking With Beasts – Megatherium
 London Review of Books – Bare Bones – Steven Shapin
 

Prehistoric sloths
Prehistoric placental genera
Pliocene xenarthrans
Pleistocene xenarthrans
Piacenzian first appearances
Holocene extinctions
Pliocene mammals of South America
Pleistocene mammals of South America
Fossils of Argentina
Fossils of Bolivia
Fossils of Brazil
Fossils of Chile
Fossils of Colombia
Fossils of Paraguay
Fossils of Peru
Fossils of Uruguay
Fossil taxa described in 1796
Taxa named by Georges Cuvier
Neogene Argentina